Taryn Onofaro is an Australian television presenter.
Born 10 October 1979 in Perth, Western Australia, she attended the Western Australian Academy of Performing Arts. During this time she worked on Perth breakfast radio and on the now defunct Access 31 community television station. 

Following her graduation from WAAPA, she produced the Showcase WA show for Access 31, which helped her gain a role on Channel 9's Y? programme, and then continued on to Queensland Escapes. However, before this show began airing on 9, Taryn was poached by the Seven Network for The Great South East, Creek to Coast and Queensland Weekender. For some time she was on both shows, which aired in the same timeslot. She also hosted the Queensland Lottery. 

Onofaro was a presenter on the Western Australian edition of Postcards Australia from 2009 to 2011.

References

Australian television presenters
Australian women television presenters
People from Perth, Western Australia
1979 births
Living people
Western Australian Academy of Performing Arts alumni